Amor secreto is a Venezuelan telenovela produced by Manuel Fedérico Fraiz-Grijalba for Venevisión. It is a remake of the 1980 telenovela Buenos días, Isabel. The telenovela is adapted by  César Sierra, Juan Carlos Duque and Mayra Villavicencio.

Alejandra Sandoval and Miguel de León star as the main protagonists while Alexandra Braun, Juan Carlos García and Caterina Valentino star as the main antagonists.

The telenovela is recorded in high definition. Production of Amor secreto began on August 1, 2014. Venevisión began airing Amor secreto from June 15, 2015 at 9:00 pm, with the final episode aired on February 15, 2016. The telenovela premiered in the United States on November 30, 2015 airing on Estrella TV.

Plot
Irene Gutiérrez is a hardworking secretary any executive would be happy to have. However, she has low self-esteem believing she is not attractive to men. She is secretly in love with her boss, millionaire Leonardo Ferrándiz, a widower who is still grieving over the loss of his wife and struggling to raise his 5 children.

Cast

Main cast 
 Miguel de León as Leonardo Ferrándiz Aristizábal
 Alejandra Sandoval as Irene Gutiérrez Vielma
 Juan Carlos García as Rodrigo Basáñez
 Alexandra Braun as Alejandra Altamirano

Also main cast 
 Carmen Julia Álvarez as Trinidad Gutiérrez Vielma
 Karina Velásquez as Virginia Gutiérrez 
 Rosmeri Marval as María Lucía Gutiérrez Vielma
 Antonio Delli as Carlos Ernesto Ferrándiz Aristizábal
 Nathalie Martínez as Agustina Villegas
 Yajaira Orta as Jimena Aristizábal de Ferrándiz

Supporting cast 
 Rosario Prieto as Coromoto
 Juan Carlos Gardié as Anzola
 Verónica Órtiz as Zulay Martinez
 Rosanna Zanetti as Altair
 Claudio De La Torre as Felipe Rincón
 José Vicente Pinto as Pablo Finol
 Mandy Mesa as Maribel Cruz
 Orlando Delgado as Leo Ferrándiz
 Luis Mayer as Julio Ferrándiz Villegas
Alejandro Díaz Iacocca as Fernando
Ornella de la Rosa as Sandra Martínez
Hecham Aljad as Jorge Arismendi
Maribel Bottoni as Oriana Castellanos
Nelson Faria as Lucas Ferrándiz Villegas
Isabella Meserón as Rebeca "Keka" Ferrándiz Villegas
Jhonny Texier as Miguel Ferrándiz Villegas

Special participation 
Caterina Valentino as Rebeca Villegas de Ferrándiz
Julio Alcázar as Adolfo Casares
Anthony Lo Russo as Tony Armas
José Vieira as Julián
Gioia Arismendi as Paula Guerrero
Mayra Africano as Gloria Viloria
Jerónimo Gil as Dr. Edgar Ventura
Magaly Serrano as Ramona Fuentes "La Traga Venao"

References

External links

 Website

Venevisión telenovelas
Venezuelan telenovelas
2015 telenovelas
Spanish-language telenovelas
2015 Venezuelan television series debuts
2016 Venezuelan television series endings
Television shows set in Caracas